The Mexico national beach soccer team represents Mexico in international Beach Football competitions and is controlled by the FEMEXFUT, the governing body for football in Mexico. Mexico have a relatively short beach soccer history, which means the key figures in their recent success remain a part of the national team set-up.

Individual awards

In addition to team victories, Mexico players have won individual awards at FIFA World Youth Cups.

Competitive record

FIFA Beach Soccer World Cup record

CONCACAF Beach Soccer Championship

World Beach Games

Central American and Caribbean Beach Games

Titles
 CONCACAF Beach Soccer World Cup qualification:
 Winners (4): 2008, 2011, 2015, 2019
 Second place (2): 2007,2017
 Third place (1): 2009, 2013
Central American and Caribbean Beach Games
 Third place (1): 2022
 Copa Latina:
 Third place (1): 2011

Current squad

See also
 Mexico national football team record
 Mexico national football team schedule and results
 Mexico national under-17 football team
 Mexico national under-20 football team
 Mexico national under-23 football team
 Mexico national futsal team

References

North American national beach soccer teams
Beach Soccer